Bachelor is a 2021 India Tamil-language adult romantic courtroom drama film written and directed by debutant Sathish Selvakumar. Produced by G.Dillibabu under the banner of Axess Film Factory. The film stars G.V. Prakash Kumar and Divya Bharathi (in her Tamil debut).

The film received mixed reviews from critics, praising G.V. Prakash's & Divya Bharathi's performance, lead pair chemistry, sound design & music but criticised the film's lengthy duration (176 minute runtime) & screenplay of the latter half of the film. Despite criticism, the film was successful at the box office.

It was released on 3 December 2021.

Plot
Darling, a reckless and narcissistic individual, relocates from his home city of Coimbatore to Bengaluru, in search of employment. He moves into a shabby dormitory, shared by his brother's comrades, namely, Bhagya a.k.a. "Bucks", Arun, Prem, Shyam and a few others. His incessant amateurism and incompetence towards any activity creates a great deal of exasperation among his roommates. Regardless, they help him in securing a job at an IT firm where they work.
While out on an errand during an evening, Darling's sloppiness results in his friend, Nimmi, getting injured. While recuperating, the latter is visited by his girlfriend, Rumi - of whose existence had been kept secret from the former. As an apology, Nimmi invites Darling to their flat, where he is introduced to Subbulakshmi a.k.a. "Subbu" – the couple's roommate. Finding himself tremendously attracted towards her, he resolves to gain her acquaintance. Learning that Nimmi and Rumi are emigrating to Boston, he convinces them into letting him stay with Subbu, albeit under conditionality.

Initially, Subbu is annoyed with Darling's presence and repeatedly spurns his advances, but she eventually warms up to him. Later, while ill in bed, she is tended to by him; his caring actions captivates her – culminating into a romantic bond between the two. Over the course of the next six months, the pair grow closer together, but Darling's arrogance often proves to be a contentious thorn between them. While visiting Coimbatore for a family reunion, Subbu informs Darling that she is pregnant, much to his horror. Although Subbu wishes to persevere and begin a family, Darling presses for an abortion, wishing to keep the affair a secret from his family.

The pair's differences over the pregnancy erupts into a jarring quarrel, ending with Subbu reluctantly agreeing to an abortion. However, she changes her mind at the last minute and mysteriously disappears, much to the surprise of Darling and his friends. With their efforts to find her all but in vain, the group discovers that she had approached her brother-in-law, Rudran – a notoriously arrogant lawyer, to seek custody of the unborn children. Seeking to punish Darling – who had previously insulted him, Rudran concocts a fictitious case, claiming that the couple are actually married, and that Subbu had been harassed by Darling's family under the name of dowry.

Acting upon Rudran's allegations, the police apprehend Darling's mother, sister and brother-in-law; they consequently denounce him. While in court, Darling's lawyer, Manoj, attempts to certify that he and Subbu were merely friends; nonetheless, Rudran stumps him by divulging the audio recordings of the pair's phone sex conversations. Infuriated, Darling attempts to coerce Subbu into withdrawing the case, but in vain. Finding himself ensnared, he reluctantly attempts to negotiate a truce with Rudran, but is scorned instead. In the ensuing hearings, Manoj manages to break Rudran's fraudulence; nonetheless, he validates the authenticity of Subbu's pregnancy, keeping the case afloat.

Cornered, Manoj proposes to have Darling act as an infertile person, seeking to deflect the case away from him; he unwillingly accedes to it. Darling's friends attempt to bribe their way into procuring a fake infertility certificate, but without success. The group finally learns of a shady "doctor" capable of inducing a state of "temporary impotency". Although hesitant, Darling subjects himself to the treatment, and is legally decreed infertile. With the case finally in Darling's favour, Nimmi visits him; he chides him for his irresponsibility towards Subbu, revealing that she chose to keep the unborn child because she loved him.

At the next hearing, Rudran attempts to salvage the case by requesting a DNA test; however, Subbu, having grown tired of his dishonesty, decides to prematurely end the case. Concurrently, Darling, having a change-in-conscience, begs her for forgiveness. Subbu scorns him, stating that he is unworthy of forgiveness and walks away. Before leaving, and as a final act of spite, she flicks him off, leaving him devastated.

Cast

Production 
In September 2019, G. V. Prakash was cast in the film. On 13 September 2019, first look of the film along with cast line up was revealed. Filming was wrapped up in October 2020. Though teaser was released on 13 February 2021, but anticipated release was delayed due to COVID-19 aftermath.

Music 

The songs were composed by G. V. Prakash Kumar, Dhibu Ninan Thomas, Siddhu Kumar and A. H. Kaashif, while Siddhu Kumar did the complete background score. The 'Life of bachelor' track may be inspired from song 'Angamaly' from malayalam movie Angamaly Diaries.

Reception 
The film received mixed to positive reviews from the critics,  praising the lead actor's performances & music, but criticised film's screenplay and excessive length. M Suganth of the Times of India gave 3 stars out of 5 and wrote that the film "is an often fascinating, indulgent peek into the life of a deeply flawed character." Praising performance of GV Prakash Kumar Suganth opined, "[and] he does a pretty good job in capturing the obnoxiousness of this character." Criticising the writing and editing Suganth stated, "Both the writing and the editing give the feeling of requiring tighter focus." Appreciating the handheld shots from Theni cinematographer, the reviewer said, "[relying on handheld shots] to narrate this tale makes us feel like we are in the midst of these characters and being part of their lives." In conclusion Suganth said, that in the ending the director didn't present the emotional effect of fallout on protagonists but only showed how it effected the lives of those around them, that's why the ending felt "less impactful despite being a progressive one."

Accolades

Notes

References

External links 
 

2021 films
2021 thriller films
Indian romantic thriller films
2020s Tamil-language films
2021 directorial debut films
Films postponed due to the COVID-19 pandemic